George Milner Stephen (18 December 1812 – 16 January 1894), often written G. Milner Stephen, was a South Australian and Victorian politician and faith healer.

Early life
Stephen born in Wells, Somerset, England, the sixth son of John Stephen, later judge of the Supreme Court of New South Wales, and his wife Mary Anne, née Pasmore. G. M. Stephen was the younger brother of Sir Alfred Stephen. Stephen was educated at Honiton Grammar School, topping every class. Stephen moved to Sydney with his father, arriving in the Prince Regent in July 1824.

Stephen won the silver medal for classics at Sydney Grammar School within his first year.

Career
Stephen was a man of unusual ability, a good administrator and a capable lawyer, interested in science, art and music, all of which he had studied. In 1831 Stephen was appointed clerk of the Supreme Court at Hobart, went to South Australia in 1838, and became advocate-general at Adelaide and a member of the South Australian Legislative Council. When Governor John Hindmarsh left the colony in 1838 Stephen administered the colony under great difficulties from July to October. There were no funds in the treasury, and Stephen had to advance the pay of the police force from his own pocket. He "carried out a heavy duty with honour, zeal, intelligence and integrity" (A. G. Price, Foundation and Settlement of South Australia, p. 130).

On 9 February 1838, Stephen was appointed advocate-general and crown solicitor in South Australia. Stephen was Colonial Secretary of South Australia from October 1838 to July 1839. He served as Acting Governor in the interregnum (16 July 1838 – 17 October 1838) between Governors Hindmarsh and Gawler,
appointing Robert Bernard to succeed him as crown solicitor and advocate-general. Stephen was appointed colonial secretary by the incoming Governor.

In July 1839 Hindmarsh and his wife Susan transferred ownership of the Section 353 (the Town of Hindmarsh) from themselves to Stephen and the surveyor Arthur Fydell Lindsay.

Stephen became involved in land speculation, the promotion of which led to his being accused of forgery and perjury. Stephen was acquitted, but was unsuccessful in an action for libel brought against the South Australian Gazette and Colonial Register in connection with this matter.

Stephen went to England to continue his law studies and was called to the bar early in 1845. He then returned to Adelaide and practised as a barrister (one of his high-profile clients was The Register's editor John Stephens), and moved to Melbourne about 1851 where he also practised with success. Stephen was in England from 1853 to 1856 and then returned to Australia. In the 2 July 1856 edition of the Melbourne Argus, an unfavourable article was printed regarding Stephen, part of which stated "We are unwilling to say more about Mr. George Milner Stephen than will suffice to save the constituency he persists in seeking to represent from the regrets that would assuredly follow his election..."

In August 1859 Stephen was elected a member of the Victorian Legislative Assembly for Collingwood and served until July 1861.

Spirituality and faith healing
A few years later Stephen went to Sydney where for two years he was acting parliamentary draughtsman. He became interested in spiritualism and believed that he could heal people by the "laying on of hands". For many years both in Sydney and Melbourne he practised in this way, and received hundreds of letters testifying to the benefits received by his patients. While his early unfortunate experience in speculating in land was continually brought up against him in later years, and militated against his public career, Stephen's work as a healer created a great deal of interest at the time.

Death
Stephen died at the Brunswick, Victoria home of his adopted daughter, Mrs. Tomlinson, following surgery to remove a large bladder stone.

Family
The Stephen family is a prominent legal dynasty in Australia. His father, John Stephen, was a judge of the Supreme Court of New South Wales, and his brother, Sir Alfred Stephen,  (20 August 1802 – 15 October 1894), was Lieutenant-Governor and Chief Justice of New South Wales. Another brother, John Stephen, (died 1854) was the earliest created alderman for the City of Melbourne.

George married Mary ( – 27 December 1887), daughter of Sir John Hindmarsh on 9 July 1840 They had seven children, including an adopted daughter:

Harold Wilberforce Hindmarsh Stephen (1841 – 30 November 1889) journalist and MLA for Monaro in New South Wales parliament
Alfred Farish Hindmarsh Stephen (ca.1844 – 18 April 1928) married Annie Muriel Beaumont on 9 August 1883 minister of religion
Florence Mary Hindmarsh Stephen (10 June 1846 – 13 July 1916) married Fredrick Albert Wilkinson on 12 May 1875
George Shadforth Hindmarsh Stephen (28 November 1848 – 12 September 1890) married Alice
Lionel Viney Hindmarsh Stephen (5 December 1854 – 3 December 1922) planted "Ivanhoe" vineyard at Pokolbin, New South Wales
Evelyn A. Hindmarsh Stephen (14 June 1861 – 7 August 1951) Registrar with Department of Mines
adopted daughter Zenobia Virginia Broderick (ca.1864 – 29 March 1925) married land broker Ralph Ward-Tomlinson ( – 26 September 1918) on 27 January 1893

References

Further reading
 Includes transcript of 1838 newspaper article which records his acceptance speech.
 

|-

|-

|-

|-

1812 births
1894 deaths
Public servants of South Australia
Members of the South Australian Legislative Council
Governors of the Colony of South Australia
Members of the Victorian Legislative Assembly
People from Wells, Somerset
19th-century Australian politicians
19th-century Australian public servants
English emigrants to colonial Australia